L&H may refer to:

 The Literary and Historical Society (University College Dublin), the college's debating society
 Lernout & Hauspie, a Belgian speech and language technology company that went bankrupt in 2001